Battle railway station is on the Hastings line in the south of England and serves the town of Battle, East Sussex. It is  down the line from London Charing Cross . The station and all trains serving it are operated by Southeastern.

It was opened on 1 January 1852. The station building was designed by William Tress, is Grade II listed and considered to be one of the finest Gothic-style small stations in the country.

Battle station consists of two platforms linked by a footbridge (with steps on both sides) and a station building housing a ticket office and waiting room. Train information is provided in the form of automated announcements, displays and poster timetables. All the original sidings have now gone and now form part of the car park. The platforms are staggered and originally did not overlap as they do now, but were extended to cater for eight-carriage trains before the 1986 electrification of the line by British Rail.

Services 
All services at Battle are operated by Southeastern using  EMUs.

The typical off-peak service in trains per hour is:
 2 tph to London Charing Cross via  (1 semi-fast, 1 stopping)

Connections 
No bus services now run from directly outside the station, although bus routes 95, 304 and 305 towards Hastings, Hastings Conquest Hospital, Bexhill-on-Sea, Hawkhurst and Tunbridge Wells stop at the end of the long approach road. These services are all operated by Stagecoach South East.

References

External links 

Transport in Hastings
Railway stations in East Sussex
DfT Category D stations
Former South Eastern Railway (UK) stations
Railway stations in Great Britain opened in 1852
Railway stations served by Southeastern
Grade II listed railway stations
Railway station
1852 establishments in England